Death on the Run (French: Le mort en fuite) is a 1936 French comedy film directed by André Berthomieu and starring Jules Berry, Michel Simon and Marie Glory. Two struggling actors decide to attract publicity by pretending that one has murdered the other, but things soon get out of hand.

It was made at the Neuilly Studios. The film's sets were designed by Jean d'Eaubonne. It was remade two years later in Britain as Break the News starring Jack Buchanan and Maurice Chevalier. In 1954 the film was remade in France.

Cast
 Jules Berry as Hector Trignol  
 Michel Simon as Achille Baluchet  
 Marie Glory as Myrra  
 Fernande Albany as Olga Stefany  
 Gaston Mauger as Le directeur du théâtre  
 Gabrielle Fontan as La concierge  
 Paul Gury as Ivan  
 Claire Gérard as Madame Irma  
 Paul Faivre as Le gardien  
 Jean Diéner 
 Hugues de Bagratide as Le juge de Sergarie  
 Georges Paulais as Un policier  
 Pierre Mindaist
 Marcel Vibert as L'avocat 
 Eddy Debray as La médecin aliéniste  
 Robert Ozanne as Le reporter 
 André Siméon as Un agent

References

Bibliography 
 Geoffrey Nowell-Smith. The Oxford History of World Cinema. Oxford University Press, 1997.

External links 
 

1936 comedy films
French comedy films
1936 films
1930s French-language films
Films directed by André Berthomieu
French black-and-white films
1930s French films